Xerospermum is a small genus of Asian plants of the family Sapindaceae.

Species
Plants of the World Online currently includes:
 Xerospermum bonii  - southern China (Yunnan, S. Guangxi), Vietnam. 
 Xerospermum laevigatum  - Bangladesh, Indochina (not Vietnam), West Malesia
 Xerospermum noronhianum  - Bangladesh, Indochina, West Malesia

Note: at least 19 species names of this genus are now considered synonymous with the type species, which is X. noronhianum.
 Xerospermum cochinchinense and X. laoticum  are now synonyms of Nephelium hypoleucum

References

External links
 Flickr: image of fruit
 

Sapindaceae
Sapindaceae genera